Anupam Mittal is an Indian entrepreneur, business executive and an angel investor. He is the founder and CEO of People Group. He is the founder of Shaadi.com. He was the judge of the television series Shark Tank India (season 1) and is now the judge of Shark Tank India (season 2). He is the receipent of the Karmaveer Chakra Award. He has served as the Chairperson of Internet and Mobile Association of India (IAMAI) from 2006–2007.

Early life and education
Mittal did his schooling in   Delhi. He did his graduation from Boston College, Massachusetts. He did his MBA in Operations and Strategic Management.

Career
Mittal started his career by working as a product manager at MicroStrategy. In 1997, he founded Sagayi.com which is now known as Shaadi.com and one of the leading matrimonial websites in India. He has served as the Chairperson of Internet and Mobile Association of India (IAMAI) from 2006–2007. In 2007, he also founded Makaan.com. In 2021, he became one of the judges of the tv series Shark Tank India (season 1). In 2023, he is also a judge in the tv series Shark Tank India (season 2).

Television series
 Mittal was a judge in Shark Tank India (season 1). He invested  in over 24 companies in the first season. 
 Mittal has also come back as a judge Shark Tank India (season 2) which started premiering from 2 January 2023.

Film Appearances 
Mittal also acted and produced in Bollywood movies of 99, Flavors (film) which was directed by his close friend Raj & DK

Awards and recognitions
 In 2011, Mittal received the award for the most innovative company in India by Fast Company, a US Buisness Publication.
Mittal received Karmaveer Chakra Award in the category of Entrepreneurs for Social Change.
Mittal was listed by Business Standard as the top angel investor in 2014 and 2015 for investing in 25 and 34 start-ups respectively.
In 2016, Mittal was listed under The 8 Most Prominent Angel Investors in India by Forbes
 In 2020, he got an award as Outstanding Serial Entrepreneur and Angel Investor by the TiE.
He has also ranked in list of 50 Most Powerful People in India by a business weekly, The Week.

References

Living people
Indian businesspeople
People from Delhi
Boston College alumni
Indian company founders
Year of birth missing (living people)